The 2013 Monaco Grand Prix (formally known as the Formula 1 Grand Prix de Monaco 2013) was a Formula One motor race that took place on 26 May 2013 at the Circuit de Monaco, a street circuit that runs through the principality of Monaco. The race was won by Nico Rosberg for Mercedes AMG Petronas, repeating the feat of his father Keke Rosberg in the 1983 race. The race was the sixth round of the 2013 season, and marked the seventy-first time the Monaco Grand Prix has been held. Rosberg had started the race from pole.

Report

Background

Tyres 
Tyre supplier Pirelli brought its yellow-banded soft compound tyre as the harder "prime" tyre and the red-banded super-soft compound tyre as the softer "option" tyre, just as they did the previous two years. It was the second time in the season that the super-soft compound was used at a race weekend, as was the case with the soft tyre compound.

Free Practice
Thursday's Free Practice sessions saw many drivers struggling to find grip on the circuit, as Jean-Éric Vergne and Kimi Räikkönen both suffered major lock-ups at turn 4, and went off into the small run-off area. Lewis Hamilton locked up badly at turn 8, with his teammate, Nico Rosberg, touching the barrier at turn 7. Grosjean and Massa both crashed into the barriers at turn 1, and with Massa's crash being on Saturday morning's Free Practice session, he was unable to compete in qualifying. Adrian Sutil crashed into the outside barrier at turn 2.

Qualifying
The three qualifying sessions were held on 25 May. Q1 and Q2 were rain-affected, with mostly dry conditions for Q3.

Q1
Force India's Paul di Resta, Caterham's Charles Pic, Sauber's Esteban Gutiérrez, Marussia's Max Chilton and Jules Bianchi, and Ferrari's Felipe Massa did not make it out of the first qualifying session. Bianchi stopped on track with an engine issue before setting a timed lap. Massa did not run a lap as his car was still being repaired following a crash in Free Practice Session No. 3. Giedo van der Garde became the first Caterham driver to advance to the second round of qualifying in the 2013 season.

Q2
Sauber's Nico Hülkenberg, Toro Rosso's Daniel Ricciardo, Lotus' Romain Grosjean, both Williams drivers Valtteri Bottas and Pastor Maldonado, as well as Caterham's Giedo van der Garde were knocked out and did not advance.

Q3
Mercedes's Nico Rosberg took pole position for the Monaco Grand Prix with a time of 1m13.876s. Mercedes's Lewis Hamilton and Red Bull's Sebastian Vettel set the next two fastest times during the final round of qualifying.

Race

Rosberg led from pole position ahead of teammate Lewis Hamilton at the start and Red Bull's Sebastian Vettel and Mark Webber. Marussia's Bianchi started from pit lane after an issue on the starting grid. Maldonado and van der Garde had contact which forced Maldonado to pit the Williams for a new front wing. On lap 9, Charles Pic pulled over near the pit entry with an engine fire in the Caterham.

Ferrari's Felipe Massa had a large shunt going into Sainte Devote, very similar to his crash in the third free practice session on Saturday, but this time it was caused by a suspension failure. The safety car was deployed for the first time in the 2013 season and Rosberg retained the lead after a pit stop. Hamilton dropped to fourth place after leaving too much of a gap to the Red Bulls.

On lap 45, Maldonado and Chilton touched near Tabac sending Maldonado into the barriers. The race was red flagged to repair damage to the barriers and remove Maldonado's wrecked Williams, although Chilton was able to resume. The race resumed behind the safety car with Rosberg leading Vettel, Webber, and Hamilton. During the red flag stop, Sergio Pérez was given the position by Alonso, who was trying to avoid a penalty caused by an earlier incident at the chicane.

Lotus's Grosjean crashed into the back of Toro Rosso's Ricciardo exiting the tunnel and the safety car was brought out once again. After the race, it was announced that Grosjean would receive a 10-place grid penalty for the Canadian Grand Prix because of the crash.

Pérez touched the barriers near the Nouvelle Chicane after trying to overtake Räikkönen on lap 69, Räikkönen had to pit for new tyres following a puncture caused by the collision. Fernando Alonso, teammate Jenson Button and Räikkönen himself later complained about Pérez's aggressive driving during the race, even though he did not receive any penalties. Pérez later retired after running down the exit road near Rascasse.

After Vettel set the race's fastest lap, 1:16.577, on lap 77 Red Bull reprimanded their driver over the radio for taking unnecessary risks, saying that there were no points to be gained for setting the fastest lap. Vettel replied "but satisfaction".

Rosberg won the race ahead of Vettel, Webber and Hamilton, having led from start to finish. His victory came 30 years after his father, Keke Rosberg, won the 1983 Monaco Grand Prix. Raikkonen passed several cars on the last two laps to take the final points position.

Classification

Qualifying
{| class="wikitable sortable" style="font-size:85%"
! 
! 
! Driver
! Constructor
! Q1
! Q2
! Q3
! 
|-
! 1
| align="center" | 9
|  Nico Rosberg
| Mercedes
| 1:24.620
| 1:16.135
| 1:13.876
| 1
|-
! 2
| align="center" | 10
|  Lewis Hamilton
| Mercedes
| 1:23.779
| 1:16.265
| 1:13.967
| 2
|-
! 3
| align="center" | 1
|  Sebastian Vettel
| Red Bull-Renault
| 1:24.243
| 1:15.988
| 1:13.980
| 3
|-
! 4
| align="center" | 2
|  Mark Webber
| Red Bull-Renault
| 1:25.352
| 1:17.322
| 1:14.181
| 4
|-
! 5
| align="center" | 7
|  Kimi Räikkönen
| Lotus-Renault
| 1:25.835
| 1:16.040
| 1:14.822
| 5
|-
! 6
| align="center" | 3 
|  Fernando Alonso
| Ferrari
| 1:23.712
| 1:16.510
| 1:14.824
| 6
|-
! 7
| align="center" | 6 
|  Sergio Pérez
| McLaren-Mercedes
| 1:24.682
| 1:17.748
| 1:15.138
| 7
|-
! 8
| align="center" | 15
|  Adrian Sutil
| Force India-Mercedes
| 1:25.108
| 1:17.261
| 1:15.383
| 8
|-
! 9
| align="center" | 5
|  Jenson Button
| McLaren-Mercedes
| 1:23.744
| 1:17.420
| 1:15.647
| 9
|-
! 10
| align="center" | 18
|  Jean-Éric Vergne
| Toro Rosso-Ferrari
| 1:23.699
| 1:17.623
| 1:15.703
| 10
|-
! 11
| align="center" | 11
|  Nico Hülkenberg
| Sauber-Ferrari
| 1:25.547
| 1:18.331
|
| 11
|-
! 12
| align="center" | 19
|  Daniel Ricciardo
| Toro Rosso-Ferrari
| 1:24.852
| 1:18.344
|
| 12
|-
! 13
| align="center" | 8
|  Romain Grosjean
| Lotus-Renault
| 1:23.738
| 1:18.603
|
| 13
|-
! 14
| align="center" | 17
|  Valtteri Bottas
| Williams-Renault
| 1:24.681
| 1:19.077
|
| 14
|-
! 15
| align="center" | 21
|  Giedo van der Garde
| Caterham-Renault
| 1:26.095
| 1:19.408
|
| 15
|-
! 16
| align="center" | 16
|  Pastor Maldonado
| Williams-Renault
| 1:23.452
| 1:21.688
|
| 16
|-
! 17
| align="center" | 14
|  Paul di Resta
| Force India-Mercedes
| 1:26.322
| 
|
| 17
|-
! 18
| align="center" | 20
|  Charles Pic
| Caterham-Renault
| 1:26.633
|
|
| 18
|-
! 19
| align="center" | 12
|  Esteban Gutiérrez
| Sauber-Ferrari
| 1:26.917
|
|
| 19
|-
! 20
| align="center" | 23
|  Max Chilton
| Marussia-Cosworth
| 1:27.303
|
|
| 22
|-
! colspan=8 | 107% time:1:29.293
|-
! 21
| align="center" | 22
|  Jules Bianchi
| Marussia-Cosworth
| no time
|
|
| 20
|-
! 22
| align="center" | 4
|  Felipe Massa
| Ferrari
| no time
|
|
| 21
|-
! colspan=8 | Source:
|-
|}Notes:'''
 — Max Chilton was given a five-place grid penalty for an unscheduled gearbox change.
 — Jules Bianchi failed to set a qualifying time within the 107% requirement after an engine failure, but was permitted to race at stewards' discretion.
 — Felipe Massa failed to set a qualifying time within the 107% requirement after his car was damaged during free practice, and his team were unable to repair the damage in time for him to take part in qualifying, despite changing the gearbox. He was permitted to race as he set qualified time during all three free practice sessions.

Race

Championship standings after the race

Drivers' Championship standings

Constructors' Championship standings

See also 
 2013 Monaco GP2 Series round

References

External links

Monaco Grand Prix
Monaco
Grand Prix
May 2013 sports events in Europe